Yarigong (Mandarin: 亚日贡乡) is a township in Batang County, Garzê Tibetan Autonomous Prefecture, Sichuan, China. In 2010, Yarigong Township had a total population of 3,275: 1,69 males and 1,606 females: 968 aged under 14, 2,180 aged between 15 and 65 and 127 aged over 65.

References 

Township-level divisions of Sichuan
Populated places in the Garzê Tibetan Autonomous Prefecture